Donnellson is a city in Lee County, Iowa, United States. The population was 885 at the time of the 2020 census. It is part of the Fort Madison–Keokuk, IA-MO Micropolitan Statistical Area.

History
Donnellson was incorporated on October 25, 1892, and named after Esten A. Donnell, a surveyor in the region.

Donnellson, plus the surrounding communities of Argyle and Montrose, is served by the Central Lee Community School District, which was consolidated into one location in 1986.

Donnellson is home to the Lee County Speedway, a  dirt oval racetrack.

Geography
Donnellson is located at  (40.643399, -91.565081).

Demographics

2010 census
As of the census of 2010, there were 912 people, 378 households, and 226 families living in the city. The racial makeup of the city was 99.0% White, 0.1% African American, 0.1% Native American, 0.2% Asian, and 0.5% from two or more races. Hispanic or Latino of any race were 0.4% of the population.

There were 378 households, of which 30.4% had children under the age of 18 living with them, 45.2% were married couples living together, 11.4% had a female householder with no husband present, 3.2% had a male householder with no wife present, and 40.2% were non-families. 35.4% of all households were made up of individuals, and 14.3% had someone living alone who was 65 years of age or older. The average household size was 2.29 and the average family size was 2.98.

The median age in the city was 41.1 years. 24.2% of residents were under 18; 7.9% were between 18 and 24; 22.6% were from 25 to 44; 25.1% were from 45 to 64, and 20.2% were 65 years of age or older. The gender makeup of the city was 48.1% male and 51.9% female.

2000 census
As of the census of 2000, there were 963 people, 386 households, and 270 families living in the city. The racial makeup of the city was 98.65% White, 0.21% African American, 0.31% Asian, 0.31% from other races, and 0.52% from two or more races. Hispanic or Latino of any race were 0.93% of the population.

There were 386 households, out of which 31.3% had children under the age of 18 living with them, 57.8% were married couples living together, 9.8% had a female householder with no husband present, and 29.8% were non-families. 27.5% of all households were made up of individuals, and 14.8% had someone living alone who was 65 years of age or older. The average household size was 2.33 and the average family size was 2.83.

In the city, the population was spread out, with 23.5% under the age of 18, 7.1% from 18 to 24, 24.1% from 25 to 44, 19.8% from 45 to 64, and 25.5% who were 65 years of age or older. The median age was 42 years. For every 100 females, there were 78.3 males. For every 100 females age 18 and over, there were 78.5 males.

The median income for a household in the city was $36,316, and the median income for a family was $41,500. Males had a median income of $34,125 versus $24,688 for females. The per capita income for the city was $18,336. About 4.3% of families and 3.6% of the population were below the poverty line, including 1.7% of those under age 18 and 5.9% of those age 65 or over.

References

External links
Donnellson Iowa Website Portal style website, Government, Business, Library, Recreation and more
City-Data.com Comprehensive Statistical Data and more about Tipton

Cities in Iowa
Cities in Lee County, Iowa
Fort Madison–Keokuk, IA-IL-MO Micropolitan Statistical Area